William Hardy (died 11 November 1878) was an Australian lawyer and politician.

Hardy was a solicitor and a partner in the prominent Sydney law firm of Stenhouse and Hardy. He was one of Charles Cowper's 21 appointments to the New South Wales Legislative Council in May 1861, but did not take his seat. He subsequently left New South Wales and returned to Ireland. He died from smallpox in 1879 at Booterstown, near Dublin.

References

Year of birth unknown
1878 deaths
Members of the New South Wales Legislative Council
Deaths from smallpox